Following is an incomplete list of past and present Members of Parliament (MPs) of the United Kingdom whose surnames begin with F.  The dates in parentheses are the periods for which they were MPs.

David Faber (1992–2001)
Michael Fabricant (1992–present)
Nicholas Fairbairn (1974–1983)
Ferdinando Fairfax, 2nd Lord Fairfax of Cameron (1640–1648)
Michael Fallon (1997–present)
Paul Farrelly (2001–present)
Tim Farron (2005–present)
Derek Fatchett (1983–1999)
Andrew Faulds (1966–1997)
Walter Fawkes (1806–1807)
Ronnie Fearn, Baron Fearn (1997–2001)
Lynne Featherstone (2005–2015) 
Sir Henry Ferguson Davie, 1st Baronet (1847–1878)
Frank Field (1979-presemt)
Mark Field (2001–present)
Terry Fields (1983–1992)
Robert Finlay, 1st Viscount Finlay (1916–1919)
Geoffrey Finsberg
Anna Firth
Herbert Fisher
Mark Fisher
Gerry Fitt
William Vesey-FitzGerald, 2nd Baron FitzGerald and Vesey
Jim Fitzpatrick
Lorna Fitzsimons
Robert Flello
Valentine Fleming
Eric Fletcher, Baron Fletcher
Howard Flight
Caroline Flint
Adrian Flook
Paul Flynn
Barbara Follett
Janet Fookes
Richard Foord
Dingle Foot
Isaac Foot
Michael Foot
Vicky Ford
Michael Forsyth
Clifford Forsythe
Eric Forth
Derek Foster
Don Foster
Michael Jabez Foster
Michael John Foster
George Foulkes, Baron Foulkes of Cumnock
Norman Fowler
Liam Fox
Marcus Fox
Hywel Francis
Mark Francois
Cecil Franks
Christopher Fraser
Sir Hugh Fraser

John Fraser
Peter Fraser, Baron Fraser of Carmyllie
Sir William Fraser, 4th Baronet
John Freeman
Roger Freeman
Freeman Freeman-Thomas, 1st Marquess of Willingdon
Thomas Fremantle
Arthur French, 1st Baron de Freyne
Douglas French
Clement Freud
Maria Fyfe

References

 F